Marcia White is an American executive. White served as president and executive director of the Saratoga Performing Arts Center (SPAC), a music venue located on the grounds of Saratoga Spa State Park in Saratoga Springs, New York, from 2005 to 2016. In 2020, she was hired as interim president of the College of Saint Rose in Albany, New York.

Education
White received a bachelor's degree from the College of Saint Rose in 2000.

Career
White was an aide to longtime New York State Senator Joe Bruno for nearly two decades. White worked on health care issues and served as Bruno's press secretary. White also helped initiate Generating Employment, a New York science program.

White is the president of Marcia White Consulting LLC.

Saratoga Performing Arts Center (SPAC)
White became the executive director of SPAC in 2005. In 2006, she secured $2.1 million in New York State funds to rehabilitate the venue. Her twin goals were to raise money and to increase SPAC's profile as a cultural and concert venue. She continued the New York City Ballet summer residency at SPAC, which had experienced declining attendance through 2005. White also created a new logo and web presence for SPAC. In 2008, White focused on promoting the Philadelphia Orchestra summer residency at SPAC, introducing performers such as pianist Yuja Wang.

During her tenure as executive director, White served on a transition team for New York Governor Eliot Spitzer.

White retired from SPAC in 2016. According to the Albany Times Union, under White's leadership, "the nonprofit emerged from a decade and half of red ink to finish each year in the black".

The College of Saint Rose
White was named interim president of her alma mater, the College of Saint Rose, in 2020. White had previously served on the college's board of trustees for 18 years. The college honored White with a Community of Excellence award in 2016 for her contributions to the college and to the Capital District.

See also
 Joe Bruno
 Saratoga Performing Arts Center (SPAC)
 Saratoga Springs, New York

References

External links
 SPAC official website

1948 births
Living people
People from Saratoga County, New York
College of Saint Rose alumni